Copha, a registered trademark of Peerless Foods, is a form of vegetable fat shortening made from hydrogenated coconut oil. Copha is produced only in Australia, but there are many suppliers of hydrogenated coconut fat in various forms worldwide. It is 100% fat, at least 98% of which is saturated. It also contains soybean lecithin.

It is used in Australia for confectionery, such as rocky road, and a number of foods for children, being an essential ingredient in white Christmas, and in chocolate crackles, which are made from Rice Bubbles, copha and cocoa powder. It is also used as a "chocolate coating" on baked goods, that amounts to a form of compound chocolate.

Concern about the health hazards of hydrogenated fats (trans fats) is a contributor to the declining popularity of Copha-based confectionery.

In New Zealand, it is marketed as Kremelta. Known in Europe as coconut fat, it is available either in its pure form, or in solid form with lecithin added as an emulsifier. In France it is marketed as Végétaline and in Germany and Denmark it is marketed as Palmin. It is not readily available in the United States.

See also

Hydrogenation
Coconut oil
Saturated fat
Shortening

References

Cooking fats